Konstanze Eickhorst (born 1961, in Bremen) is a German pianist.

Eickhorst won the IX Clara Haskil (1981) and IV Géza Anda (1988) competitions. A member of the Linos Ensemble, she has been active at an international level as a soloist and a chamber musician, and has recorded for CPO. She teaches at the Musikhochschule Lübeck.

References
 C. Bechstein Pianofortefabrik [ + ]
 ArkivMusic

1961 births
Living people
Musicians from Bremen
German classical pianists
German women pianists
21st-century classical pianists
Women classical pianists
21st-century women pianists